Angelos Perikleous (born January 5, 1990) is a Cypriot football player who currently plays for AEL Limassol Futsal team.

External links
 

1990 births
Living people
Cypriot footballers
Association football midfielders
Cyprus under-21 international footballers
AEL Limassol players
Atromitos Yeroskipou players
Ethnikos Achna FC players
Nikos & Sokratis Erimis FC players
Cypriot First Division players